Beat the System may refer to:

 Beat the System (band), a Malaysian/American rock band
 Beat the System (album), an album by Christian rock band Petra
 Beat the System, a 2011 EP by Alyson Stoner
Beat the System, a record label, see The Fits